Lost and Found: The Story of Cook's Anchor, also known as Lost and Found: The Story of an Anchor, is a 1979 New Zealand documentary television film directed and co-written by David Lean.

Plot
His property master, Eddie Fowlie, discovers the whereabouts of an anchor which had belonged to Captain James Cook, and historians and experts arrive to examine it before an attempt is made to raise it and bring it to land.

See also
 The Bounty (1984 film)

References

External links
Lost and Found: The Story of Cook's Anchor full documentary viewable for free, provided by NZ On Screen (state-funded by New Zealand)

1979 television films
1979 films
New Zealand documentary films
New Zealand television films
1979 documentary films
Documentary television films
1970s English-language films